Faupala is a surname. Notable people with the surname include:

David Faupala (born 1997), French footballer 
Kapeliele Faupala (born 1940), Wallis and Futuna monarch

Surnames of Oceanian origin